Capillary Action was an American avant-rock/experimental music group formed at Oberlin College in 2004 by Philadelphia native Jonathan Pfeffer, the group's sole constant member, and active until 2012.

Capillary Action's self-described “confrontational cubist-pop” was characterized by an unusual blend of acoustic timbres; complex, constantly shifting meter; and Pfeffer's 12-tone and Philly soul-inspired baritone vocals. The lyrics often employed autobiographical themes to critique power structures.

The group performed extensively across North America and Europe alongside Joe Lally, The USA Is a Monster, The Max Levine Ensemble, Už jsme doma, Lightning Bolt, Dirty Projectors, Deerhoof, Les Claypool, Rhys Chatham, Shudder to Think, and Dos, among others. 

In 2009, Boston Phoenix named Capillary Action the Best New Band from New York, likening the group to "Both Elvises in a serious Burt Bachawreck with the Mothers of Invention".

In 2011, Capillary Action performed at Willisau, Incubate, Primavera, Pop Revo, and Rumor Festivals.

Discography
 So Embarrassing - 2008 (US), 2009 on Discorporate (EU)
 Capsized - 2011

Footnotes 

American experimental musical groups